Alan George Heywood Melly (17 August 1926 – 5 July 2007) was an English jazz and blues singer, critic, writer, and lecturer. From 1965 to 1973 he was a film and television critic for The Observer; he also lectured on art history, with an emphasis on surrealism.

Early life and career
Melly was born at The Grange, St Michael's Hamlet, Toxteth, Liverpool, Lancashire, the elder son and eldest of three children of wool broker Francis Heywood Melly and (Edith) Maud, née Isaac. His mother was Jewish. Melly was a descendant of the shipowner and Liberal MP George Melly. He was also a relative of the philanthropist Emma Holt, of Sudley House Liverpool; her sister had married Melly's great-grandfather.

Melly was educated at Stowe School, Buckinghamshire where he discovered his interest in modern art, jazz and blues and started coming to terms with his sexuality.

Melly was an atheist. Interviewed by Nigel Farndale in 2005, Melly said "I don't understand people panicking about death. It's inevitable. I'm an atheist; you'd think it would make it worse, but it doesn't. I've done quite a lot in the world, not necessarily of great significance, but I have done it."

Interest in surrealist art
Melly once said that he may have been drawn to surrealism by a particular experience he had during his teenage years. A frequent visitor to Liverpool's Sefton Park near his home, he often entered its tropical Palm House and there chatted to wounded soldiers from a nearby military hospital. It was the incongruity of this sight, men smoking among the exotic plants, dressed in their hospital uniforms and usually missing a limb, that he felt he later recognised in the work of the Surrealists.

He joined the Royal Navy at the end of the Second World War because, as he quipped to the recruiting officer, the uniforms were "so much nicer". As he related in his autobiography Rum, Bum and Concertina, he was crestfallen to discover that he would not be sent to a ship and was thus denied the "bell-bottom" uniform he desired. Instead he received desk duty and wore the other Navy uniform, described as "the dreaded fore-and-aft". Later, however, he did go to sea but never saw action; he was almost court-martialled for distributing anarchist literature.

Post-war life and career
After the war Melly found work in a London surrealist gallery, working with E. L. T. Mesens and eventually drifted into the world of jazz, finding work with Mick Mulligan's Magnolia Jazz Band. This was a time (1948 onwards) when New Orleans and "New Orleans Revival" style jazz were very popular in Britain. In January 1963, the British music magazine NME reported that the biggest trad jazz event to be staged in Britain had taken place at Alexandra Palace. The event included Alex Welsh, Diz Disley, Acker Bilk, Chris Barber, Kenny Ball, Ken Colyer, Monty Sunshine, Bob Wallis, Bruce Turner, Mick Mulligan and Melly.

In 1956 he became a writer on the Daily Mails satirical newspaper strip Flook, illustrated by Trog. He continued this until 1971. He retired from jazz in 1962 when he became a film critic for The Observer He was also scriptwriter on the 1967 satirical film Smashing Time. The period from 1948 until 1963 is described in Owning Up. He returned to jazz in the early 1970s with John Chilton's Feetwarmers, a partnership that ended in 2003. He later sang with Digby Fairweather's band. He released six albums in the 1970s including Nuts in 1972 and Son of Nuts the next year. He wrote a light column, Mellymobile, in Punch magazine describing their tours.

He was an Honorary Associate of the National Secular Society and a Distinguished Supporter of the British Humanist Association. Melly was President of the BHA 1972–4, and was also an Honorary Associate of the Rationalist Association. He was also a member of the Max Miller Appreciation Society and, on 1 May 2005, joined Roy Hudd, Norman Wisdom, and others to unveil a statue of Miller in Brighton.

His singing style in particular for the blues, was strongly influenced by his idol, Bessie Smith. While many British musicians of the time treated jazz and blues with almost religious solemnity, Melly rejoiced in their more bawdy side, and this was reflected in his choice of songs and exuberant stage performances. He recorded a track called "Old Codger" with The Stranglers in 1978, for which the lyrics were especially written for him by then band member, Hugh Cornwell.

Melly, who was bisexual, moved from strictly homosexual relationships in his teens and twenties to largely heterosexual relationships from his thirties onwards. He married twice and had a child from each marriage, though his first child Pandora was not known to be his until she was much older. He married his second wife, Diana Moynihan (née Dawson), in 1963 and they lived on Gloucester Crescent in Camden Town. She brought with her two children (Candy and Patrick) from two previous marriages. Patrick died from a heroin overdose in his twenties. Their own son, Tom, was born two days after the wedding. Diana published an autobiography in 2005 of their life and (open) marriage together.

Brecon
George and Diana Melly had a country retreat, the Tower, at Scethrog in the Brecon Beacons, between 1971 and 1999. This was somewhere Melly could escape the jazz world and indulge his love of fishing on the River Usk. Jazz followed him to Wales and this led to a series of celebrated performances in the area and in the South Wales valleys.

In 1984 the Brecon Jazz Festival was conceived by a group of jazz enthusiasts who gained widespread support from the local community. Melly was the first musician to be contracted for the opening festival and remained a supporter until his death. He was a factor in the festival's success and served as its president in 1991.

As well as being the President of the Contemporary Arts Society for Wales, Melly was a contemporary art collector. His passion for surrealist art continued throughout his life and he lectured and wrote extensively on the subject.

His passion for fly-fishing never dwindled and in later life he sold several important paintings (by Magritte and Picasso) enabling him to buy a mile of land by the River Usk. In 2000 he published Hooked!, a book on fly-fishing.

Later years and death
Melly was still active in music, journalism, and lecturing on surrealism and other aspects of modern art until his death, despite worsening health problems such as vascular dementia, incipient emphysema, and lung cancer. His encouragement and support to gallery owner Michael Budd led to a posthumous exhibition for the modern abstract artist François Lanzi.

Melly suffered from environmental hearing loss because of long-term exposure to stage sound systems, and his hearing in both ears became increasingly poor. Despite these problems, Melly would often joke that he found some parts of his ailing health to be enjoyable. He often equated his dementia to a quite amusing LSD trip, and took a lot of pleasure from his deafness, which he said made many boring conversations more interesting. On Sunday 10 June 2007, Melly made an appearance, announced as his last ever performance, at the 100 Club in London. This was on the occasion of a fund-raising event to benefit the charity supporting his carers.

He died at his London home of lung cancer and emphysema (which he had for the last two years of his life), aged 80, on 5 July 2007. His humanist funeral was held at the West London Crematorium, in Kensal Green. The hearse was led by a jazz band, including Kenny Ball on trumpet, playing a New Orleans funeral march. His cardboard coffin was covered with old snapshots and cartoons of Melly by his friends, as well as hand-drawn decorations.

On 17 February 2008 BBC Two broadcast George Melly's Last Stand (produced by Walker George Films), an intimate portrayal of Melly's last months. His sister Andrée Melly was an actress, who lived in Ibiza with her husband, Oscar Quitak. In 2018 writer, musician and film maker Chris Wade made a documentary about Melly entitled The Certainty of Hazard, featuring his wife Diana, son Tom, and various friends and associates.

Bibliography
I, Flook (cartoon strip in the Daily Mail with Wally Fawkes illustrating, 1962).
Owning Up (autobiography, covering his career during the trad-jazz boom, 1965)
The Media Mob, with Barry Fantoni (1970)
Revolt into Style: The Pop Arts in Britain (1970)
Rum, Bum and Concertina (autobiography, covering his years in the Navy in the 1940s, 1977)
A Tribe of One: Great Naive and Primitive Painters of the British Isles (1981)
Great Lovers (1981, text only—art and research by Walter Dorin)
Swans Reflecting Elephants: A Biography of Edward James (1982)
Mellymobile (1982)
Scouse Mouse (autobiography, covering his childhood in Liverpool, 1984)
It's All Writ Out for You: Life and Work of Scottie Wilson (1986)
Paris and the Surrealists (1991)
Don't Tell Sybil: An Intimate Memoir of E. L. T. Mesens (1997)
Hooked! Fishing Memories (2000)
Slowing Down (memoir, 2005)

Books partly about Melly
Take a Girl Like Me (autobiography by his wife, Diana Melly, 2005)
Hot Jazz, Warm Feet (autobiography of his long-time colleague John Chilton, 2007)
On the Road with George Melly (memoir by Digby Fairweather, 2013)
The Life and Work of George Melly (book on Melly's books and music, written by Chris Wade, 2018)

Selected discography

Singles
George Melly Trio
 "Rock Island Line" b/w "Send Me to the 'Lectric Chair" (Tempo A96) (1951)
George Melly With Alex Welsh and his Dixielanders
 "Frankie and Johnny" b/w "I'm Down in the Dumps" (Decca 45-F 10457) (1952)
George Melly
 "Kitchen Man" b/w "Jazzbo Brown from Memphis Town" (Tempo A104)
George Melly With Mick Mulligan and his Band
 "Kingdom Coming" b/w "I'm a Ding Dong Daddy" (Decca 45-F 10763) (1956)
George Melly With Mick Mulligan's Jazz Band
 "Jenny's Ball" b/w "Muddy Water" (Tempo A 144) (July 1956)
George Melly With Mick Mulligan and his Band
 "Waiting For a Train" b/w Railroadin' Man (Decca 45-F 10779)
George Melly With Mick Mulligan and his Band
 "Heebie Jeebies" b/w "My Canary Has Circles Under His Eyes" (Decca 45-F 10806)
George Melly
 "Black Bottom" b/w "Magnolia" (Decca 45-F-10840) (1957)
 "Abdul Abulbul Amir" b/w "Get Away, Old Man, Get Away" (Decca F-11115) (February 1959)
 "Ise a Muggin'" b/w "Run Come See Jerusalem" (Pye 7N 15353) (February 1960)
 "Monkey and the Baboon" b/w "Funny Feathers" (Columbia 45-DB 4664) (1963?)
George Melly and the Feetwarmers
 "Nuts" b/w "Sam Jones Blues" (Warner Brothers K16249) (February 1973)
George Melly with John Chilton's Feetwarmers
 "Good Time George" b/w "My Canary Has Circles Under His Eyes" (Warner Brothers K16533) (March 1974)
George Melly with John Chilton's Feetwarmers and His Orchestra
 "Billy Fisher" b/w "Punchdrunk Mama" (CBS 2405) (May 1974)
George Melly with John Chilton's Feetwarmers
 "Ain't Misbehavin'" b/w "My Canary Has Circles Under His Eyes" (Warner Brothers K16533) (March 1975)
George Melly with John Chilton's Feetwarmers and Other Friends
 "I Long To Get It On Down" b/w "Inflation Blues" (Warner Brothers K16574) (June 1975)
George Melly
 "Pennies from Heaven" b/w "Punch and Judy" (Reprise Records K14453) (November 1976)
 "Makin' Whoopee" b/w "Everybody Loves My Baby" (PRT Records 7P 268) (1983)
George Melly with John Chilton's Feetwarmers
 "Masculine Women, Feminine Men" b/w "It's The Bluest Kind of Blues" (PRT Records 7P 318) (1984)
 "Hometown" b/w "I Won't Grow Old" (PRT Records 7P 368) (1986)
 "Anything Goes" b/w "September Song" (PYS 14) (1988)

Extended players
George Melly with Mick Mulligan's Jazz Band
 George Melly (Tempo EXA 41) (July 1956): "Jenny's Ball" / "Organ Grinder" / "Muddy Water" / "You've Got The Right Key But The Wrong Keyhole"
 George Melly Sings Doom (Tempo EXA 46) (November 1956): "Send Me To The 'Lectric Chair" / "Cemetery Blues" / "Blue Spirit Blues" / "Death Letter"
 Nothing Personal. George Melly Sings The Blues (Decca DFE 6552) (December 1958): "Michigan Water Blues" / "Ma Rainey's Black Bottom" / "St. Louis Blues" / "Spider Crawl"
George Melly
 George Melly Sings Songs Of Frank Crumit (Decca DFE 6557) (1959): "Abdul Abulbul Amir" / "Get Away Old Man, Get Away" / "Granny's Old Armchair" / "Donald The Dub (The Dirty Little Pill)"
 The Psychological Significance Of Animal Symbolism In American Negro Folk Music And All That Jazz (Columbia SEG 8093) (1961): "Monkey And The Baboon" / "Put It Right Here" / "Black Mare Blues" / "Funny Feathers"

LPs
George Melly
 Nothing Personal (Decca) (1958)
Mick Mulligan's Magnolia Jazz Band With George Melly
 Meet Mick Mulligan (Pye NJ 21) (1959). Re-released on LP Pye NSPL 18424 (1973) and possibly on CD Hallmark (2011)
George Melly
 Nuts (Warner Bros. K46188) (1972)
 Son of Nuts (Warner Bros. K46269) (1973)
 It's George (Warner Bros. K56087) (1974)
 Melly Is At It Again (Reprise K54084) (1976)
 Melly Sings Hoagy (Pye NSPL 18557) (1978)
 George Melly Sings Fats Waller (Pye NSPL 18602) (1979)
 Let's Do It (PRT Records N131) (1980)
 Like Sherry Wine (PRT Records N140) (1981)
 Makin' Whoopie (PRT Records N147) (1982)
 The Many Moods of Melly (PRT Records N6550) (1984)
 Running Wild (Precision Records) (1986)
 Anything Goes (PRT Records PYL15) (1988)
 Puttin' On the Ritz (Legacy Records LLP 135) (1990)

LP compilations
 The World of George Melly (The Fifties) (Decca SPA 288) (1973)
 Unforgettable 16 Golden Classics (Castle UNLP 014)

Original CDs
 The Many Moods of Melly (PRT Records N6550) (1984)
 Running Wild (Precision Records CDN 6562) (1986)
 Anything Goes (PRT Records PYC 15) (1988)
 Puttin' On the Ritz (Legacy Records LLCD 135) (1990)
 Frankie and Johnny (D Sharp DSH CD 7001) (1992)
 Best of Live (D Sharp DSH LCD 7019) (1995)
 Anything Goes (Pulse PLS CD 112) (1996). Compilation CD with 11 of the 12 tracks from the original LP and 11 additional tracks from the LP Puttin' On the Ritz
 Singing and Swinging the Blues (Robinwood RWP 0019) (2003). George Melly and Digby Fairweather's Half Dozen
 The Ultimate Melly (Candid CCD 79843) (2006). George Melly and Digby Fairweather's Half Dozen
 Farewell Blues (Lake LACD 250) (2007). George Melly and Digby Fairweather's Half Dozen

CD compilations and reissues
 Golden Hour of George Melly (Knight Records) (1994). Compilation of Pye/PRT Recordings'.
 The Best of George Melly (Kaz 22) (1992). Compilation of Pye recordings, with both John Chilton and Mick Mulligan'.
 The Best of George Melly (TrueTrax TRT CD 160) (1994). Compilation CD with tracks from Anything Goes and Puttin' On the Ritz
 Meet Mick Mulligan and George Melly (Lake LACD66) (1996). Reissue of Meet Mick Mulligan, with four additional tracks by Mick Mulligan
 Ravers (Lake LACD150) (2001). Mick Mulligan and His Jazz Band, featuring George Melly. Includes Melly's singles from 1956
 Goodtime George (Spectrum 544 465–2) (2001/6?). Retitled reissue of The World of George Melly with additional tracks
 The Pye Jazz Anthology (Castle CMDDD 483) (2002)
 Live (Lake LACD176) (2002). Mick Mulligan and His Jazz Band with George Melly (on some tracks). Reissue of the band's cuts on the Tempo LPs Third British Festival of Jazz (Tempo TAP LP 11) (1956) and Jazz at The Railway Arms (Tempo TAP LP 14) (1957)
 Nuts / Son of Nuts (Warner Brothers 6751781) (2004)
 First and Last (for dementia GMFDAND01) (2008) Career spanning anthology (with some previously unreleased tracks) produced posthumously
 Nothing Personal (Lake LACD 265) (2008). Reissue of Nothing Personal, with additional material
 Sporting Life (Hallmark) (2011). Retitled reissue of The World of George Melly
 George Melly Sings Doom (Cherry Red El ACMEM273CD) (2014). Compilation of Decca recordings

References

External links

 George Melly website
 BBC Obituary
 Sarah Knapton, "George Melly, jazz legend and zoot suit king, dies", The Guardian, 6 July 2007
 "George Melly" (obituary), The Economist, 12 July 2007

1926 births
2007 deaths
English humanists
English jazz singers
English male journalists
English male voice actors
Musicians from Liverpool
Writers from Liverpool
English bisexual writers
English LGBT singers
English LGBT journalists
English LGBT actors
Bisexual singers
Bisexual journalists
Bisexual male actors
People educated at Stowe School
Deaths from lung cancer in England
20th-century English male singers
British comics writers
English atheists
Royal Navy personnel of World War II
20th-century English LGBT people
21st-century English LGBT people